Akbarpur Airstrip is an airstrip/aerodrome located in Akbarpur, Ambedkar Nagar, Uttar Pradesh.

Description 

The government is giving this airstrip to private investors for setting up their pilot training institutes and aircraft maintenance engineering institutes.This is an Aerodrome operated by the State Government.
 Type of operation : VFR
 Owner/Operator : State Government
 Aerodrome Elevation (Meters) : N/A
 Coordinates :2627N-08234E
 Runway : 11/29
 Dimensions : 5972 ft. x 99 ft.
 Surface : Asphalt
Suitable for aircraft : Hawker 900XP

Previously, the procedure for private use of the airstrip was lengthy: The owner of the private aircraft had to contact the respective district magistrate who would further contact the directorate which would take the measures required for landing of the aircraft. Now, according to the new order, the directorate will only give its nod and the institutes will take care of the rest.

In 2003, the state government had issued similar orders exclusively for people from the film industry. The charges were Rs 200 per landing along with Rs 1,000 per day for shooting at the air strip. The airstrip was, however, never used for shooting. The government has also decided to give subsidy in the landing and parking for ‘cross- country flying’ purposes, which means flying trainer aircraft from one aerodrome to another. Such aircraft will be charged half of the normal landing and parking fee, which will be Rs 250 for landing and Rs 100 per day for parking after two days of free parking.

Scheduled flights 
There are no scheduled flights.  The airport is used by private and chartered planes.

See also 
 Lucknow International Airport
 Varanasi International Airport
 Taj International Airport
 Kanpur Airport
 Allahabad Airport
 Raebareli Airport
 Faizabad Airport

References

External links 

Airports in Uttar Pradesh
Ambedkar Nagar district
Akbarpur, Ambedkar Nagar
Airports with year of establishment missing